Gene Francis Alan Pitney (February 17, 1940 – April 5, 2006) was an American singer-songwriter and musician.

Pitney charted 16 top-40 hits in the United States, four in the top ten. In the United Kingdom, he had 22 top-40 hit singles, including 11 in the top ten. Among his most famous hits are "Town Without Pity", "(The Man Who Shot) Liberty Valance", "Twenty Four Hours from Tulsa", "I'm Gonna Be Strong", "It Hurts to Be in Love", and "Something's Gotten Hold of My Heart". He also wrote the early-1960s hits "Rubber Ball" recorded by Bobby Vee, "Hello Mary Lou" by Ricky Nelson, and "He's a Rebel" by the Crystals. In 2002, he was inducted into the Rock and Roll Hall of Fame.

Early years
Pitney was born in Hartford, Connecticut, United States, the son of Anna A. (Orlowski) and Harold F. Pitney. The third of five children of a lathe operator, Pitney lived with his family in Rockville, Connecticut, during his formative years. He grew up in Rockville, now part of Vernon, Connecticut.

Pitney's early influences were Clyde McPhatter and doo-wop groups such as The Crows. He attended Rockville High School where he formed his first band, Gene & the Genials. Gene's first recordings were in 1958 with a Connecticut singing group called the Embers. Those recordings were not released until 1990. In early 1959, he released two records on the Decca label, "Snuggle Up Baby" and "Classical Rock and Roll", as part of a duo called Jamie and Jane with Ginny Arnell. Later that year, he had his first solo release "Cradle Of My Arms" under the name Billy Bryan on the Blaze record label. His first release under his real name was in 1960 on the Festival label titled "I'll Find You".

Career

Rise to fame (1961–1964)
Signed to songwriter Aaron Schroeder's newly formed Musicor label in 1961, Pitney scored his first chart single, which made the Top 40, the self-penned "(I Wanna) Love My Life Away", on which he played several instruments and multi-tracked the vocals. He followed that same year with his first Top 20 single, "Town Without Pity", from the 1961 film of the same title. Written by Dimitri Tiomkin and Ned Washington, the song won a Golden Globe Award and was nominated for an Academy Award for Best Song, but lost to "Moon River". Pitney performed the song at the Oscars ceremony on April 9, 1962.

He is also remembered for the Burt Bacharach–Hal David song "(The Man Who Shot) Liberty Valance", which peaked at No. 4 in 1962. Though it shares a title with the John Wayne western, the song was not used in the film because of a publishing dispute.

Meanwhile, Pitney wrote hits for others, including "Today's Teardrops" for Roy Orbison, "Rubber Ball" for Bobby Vee, "Hello Mary Lou" for Ricky Nelson, and "He's a Rebel" for the Crystals (later recorded by Vikki Carr and Elkie Brooks). "Rebel" kept Pitney's own No. 2 hit "Only Love Can Break a Heart", his highest-charting single in the US, from the top spot on 3 November 1962, the only time that a writer shut himself (or herself) out of the No. 1 position.

He followed up in December with "Half Heaven, Half Heartache", which reached No. 12 on the Billboard chart. Because of his success on the music charts, and as he explained to his friend, oldies DJ 'Wild' Wayne, an unknown radio disc jockey at the time gave Pitney the nickname 'The Rockville Rocket', which caught on.

Pitney's popularity in the UK market was ensured by the breakthrough success of "Twenty Four Hours from Tulsa", a Bacharach and David song, which peaked at No. 5 in Britain at the start of 1964. It was only Pitney's third single release in the UK to reach the singles chart, and the first to break into the Top Twenty there; it was also a hit in the US, peaking at No. 17 on the Hot 100.

Involvement with the Rolling Stones (1964)
Pitney was present with Phil Spector at some of the Rolling Stones' early recording sessions in London, including "Little by Little" and other tracks for their debut album; he played piano, though the extent of this is uncertain.

The Jagger/Richards song "That Girl Belongs to Yesterday" was a No. 7 UK hit for Pitney in 1964; it was the first tune composed by the duo to become a Top 10 hit in the UK. In the US, the single stalled at No. 49, ending a run of seven Top 40 singles for Pitney as a performer.

Maintaining popularity
After another low-charting single, 1964's "Yesterday's Hero", Pitney rebounded with another string of hits in the mid-1960s, including the 1964 singles "It Hurts to Be in Love" and "I'm Gonna Be Strong", which reached No. 7 and No. 9, respectively, in the US, and 1966's "Nobody Needs Your Love", which peaked at No. 2 in the UK, matching the No. 2 UK peak of "I'm Gonna Be Strong". "It Hurts to Be in Love" had been planned for and recorded by Neil Sedaka, but RCA refused to release it because Sedaka had recorded the song outside RCA Victor in violation of his contract. The writers, Howard Greenfield and Helen Miller, presented the song to Pitney. Miller replaced Sedaka's voice with Pitney's, though Sedaka's trademark backing harmonies were left intact.

In 1965, Pitney recorded two successful albums with country singer George Jones. They were voted the most promising country-and-western duo of the year. Pitney also recorded songs in Italian, Spanish, and German and twice finished second in Italy's annual Sanremo Music Festival, where his strong vibrato reminded older listeners of the Italian tenor Enrico Caruso. He had a regional hit with "Nessuno mi può giudicare".

UK, Australian and European stardom (1966–1970s)
Pitney's career in the US took a downturn after mid-1966, when "Backstage" ended another run of Top 40 hits. He returned one last time to the Top 40 with "She's a Heartbreaker" in mid-1968 and placed several singles in the lower reaches of the Hot 100 after that, but by 1970 he was no longer a hit-maker in the US.

Pitney maintained a successful career in Britain and the rest of Europe into the 1970s, appearing regularly on UK charts as late as 1974. UK pianist Maurice Merry was his musical director from 1970 onwards. In Australia, after a fallow period in the early 1970s, Pitney returned to the Top 40 in 1974, when both "Blue Angel" (No. 2) and "Trans-Canada Highway" (No. 14; production by David Mackay) were substantial hits. Pitney continued to place records in the Australian charts through 1976, including the hit "Down This Road", written and produced by distant relative Edward Pitney. They also collaborated in the production of the hit song "Days of Summer".

In the early 1970s, Pitney decided to spend only six months each year on the road in order to spend more time with his family.

Later career
Pitney's last hit on the UK charts came in 1989, after an absence of 15 years, when he and Soft Cell singer Marc Almond recorded a duet version of "Something's Gotten Hold of My Heart" by British writers Roger Cook and Roger Greenaway. The song had been a UK No. 5 for Pitney in 1967. The duet brought him his first UK No. 1, in late January 1989. The single remained at the top for four weeks, and also went to No. 1 in Germany, Finland, Switzerland and Ireland. Pitney and Almond appeared on the Terry Wogan television show in Britain.

In 2000, Pitney sang harmony vocals on Jane Olivor's recording of his 1962 hit "Half Heaven – Half Heartache", which was released on her 'comeback' album Love Decides.

On 18 March 2002, Pitney was inducted by singer Darlene Love into the Rock and Roll Hall of Fame.

This Morning incident
Pitney was involved in a gaffe on ITV's This Morning in 1989, owing to a "technical mishap". Giving a performance of his track "You're the Reason", Pitney missed his cue and was seen "failing dismally to mime along in time to his backing track"; he continued with the song, and found humor in the incident. It has been repeated on television over the years, notably on a 2002 episode of BBC One series Room 101, in which host Paul Merton described it as a "very funny moment" in which Pitney came in "unbearably late". It was re-aired on the 25th anniversary edition of This Morning in 2013, in which presenter Holly Willoughby "broke out into a cold sweat" while reliving the moment.

Personal life
At the height of his fame in 1967, Pitney married his childhood sweetheart, Lynne Gayton, and the couple had three sons, Todd, Chris, and David.

Death
Pitney was touring the UK in the spring of 2006 when his manager found him dead in his hotel room following a concert in Cardiff, Wales, on April 5. An autopsy found the cause of death to be a heart attack and that he had severely occluded coronary arteries. His final show at Cardiff's St David's Hall had earned him a standing ovation; he ended with "Town Without Pity". He was laid to rest at Somers Center Cemetery in Somers, Connecticut.

Posthumous tributes
Marc Almond recorded "Backstage (I'm Lonely)" for his 2007 covers album Stardom Road.

On September 20, 2007, a plaque to Pitney was unveiled at the town hall in his hometown of Rockville, Connecticut. Members of the family attended. The event was emceed by oldies radio DJ and Pitney friend "Wild" Wayne. Governor Jodi Rell also declared September 20, 2007, as Gene Pitney Day in the state of Connecticut. The Gene Pitney Commemorative Committee established a music scholarship in Pitney's name. It is awarded annually to Rockville High School. In October 2008, an international fan convention was held in Rockville.

Discography

Albums
 The Many Sides of Gene Pitney (1962)
 Spotlight on Gene Pitney & NewCastle Trio (1962)
 Only Love Can Break a Heart (1962)
 Gene Pitney Sings Just for You (1963)
 Gene Pitney Sings World Wide Winners (1963)
 Blue Gene (1963)
 Gene Pitney Meets the Fair Young Ladies of Folkland[A] (1964)
 Gene Pitney's Big Sixteen (1964)
 Gene Italiano (1964)
 It Hurts to Be in Love and Eleven More Hit Songs[B] (1964)
 Gene Pitney's Big Sixteen, Volume Two[C] (1965)
 For the First Time! Two Great Stars - George Jones and Gene Pitney (1965)
 I Must Be Seeing Things[D] (1965)
 It's Country Time Again! (with George Jones) (1965)
 Looking Through the Eyes of Love[E] (1965)
 The Great Songs of Our Time (1965) Stateside SL 10156
 Español (1966)
 Being Together (with Melba Montgomery) (1966)
 Big Sixteen Volume 3 (1966)-
 Backstage (I'm Lonely)[F] (1966)
 Nessuno Mi Può Giudicare (1966)
 Greatest Hits of All Times (1966)
 The Country Side of Gene Pitney (1966)
 Young and Warm and Wonderful (1966)
 Just One Smile (1967)
 Golden Greats (1967)
 The Gene Pitney Story (1968)
 Español, Volume 2 (1968)
 Gene Pitney Sings Burt Bacharach and Others (1968)
 She's a Heartbreaker[G] (1968)
 The Greatest Hits of Gene Pitney (1969)
 This is Gene Pitney Singing The Platters' Golden Platters (1970)
 Super Star[H] (1970)
 Ten Years Later (1971)
 New Sounds of Gene Pitney (1972)
 The Golden Hits of Gene Pitney (1972)
 Pitney '75 (1975)
 Backstage: The Greatest Hits and More (1990)
 You're The Reason (1990)
 Anthology(1961-1968) (1990)
 Hits and Misses (1993)
 Heartbreaker (1994)
 George Jones & Gene Pitney (1994)
 More Greatest Hits (1995)
 Greatest Hits (1995)
 Great Gene Pitney (1996)
 Very Best of Gene Pitney (1997)
 22 Greatest Hits (1998)
 25 All-Time Greatest Hits (1999)
 Defenitive Collection (1999)
 Many Sides of Gene Pitney/Only Love Can Break a Heart (1999) (2010)
 Looking Through (Ultimate Collection) (2001)
 His Golden Classics (2001)
 I'm Gonna be Strong (2002)
 Blue Angel: The Bronze Sessions (2003)
 Something's Gotten Hold of My Heart (2003)
 Street Called Hope (2004)
 Big Twenty: All the UK Top Hits, 1961-1973 (2004)
 Love Grows (2005)
 24 Hours From Tulsa (2005)
 Something's Gotten Hold of My Heart (2005)
 Platinum Collection (2007)
 Best of Gene Pitney (2008)
 Sings Just For You/World Wide Winners (2011)
 Country Side of Gene Pitney (2012)
 Blue Gene/Meets the Fair Young Ladies of Folkland (2013)
 I'm Gonna be Strong/Looking Thru the Eyes of Love (2013)
 Cradle of My Arms: Complete Gene Pitney (2013)
 The Collection: The Original Musicor Master Tapes (2018)
Notes
 A ^ Originally released as Dedicated to My Teen Queens
 B–H Released in the UK as: B. ^ I'm Gonna Be Strong, C. ^ Gene Pitney More Big Sixteen, D. ^ Looking Through the Eyes of Love, E. ^ Sings the Great Songs of Our Time, F. ^ Nobody Needs Your Love, G. ^ Pitney Today, H. ^ Ten Years Later

Singles

Note that release dates refer to initial release. Pitney's early singles generally appeared one to four months later in the UK/Australia. Many of his later releases are UK/Australia/NZ only.

 

Sources include Joel Whitburn's Record Research material for the US Top 100, "Bubbling Under" and US Country charts; Tim Rice et al., Guinness Book of Hit Singles for the UK; CHUM Chart for Canada prior to mid-1964, and the Canadian RPM charts thereafter; and The Kent Report for Australia

References

External links

Gene Pitney bio
THE OFFICIAL "WILD" WAYNE WEBSITE – Connecticut based nationally known Oldies Radio DJ & friend of Gene Pitney
Rock and Roll Hall of Fame
Report of Pitney's death from BBC News
BBC Obituary
Obituary from The Guardian
Fan's Final Chat with Gene Pitney
Interview with Gene Pitney in International Songwriters Association's "Songwriter Magazine", concentrating on his songwriting career

1941 births
2006 deaths
20th-century American singers
21st-century American singers
American country singer-songwriters
American male pop singers
American male singer-songwriters
Epic Records artists
Musicians from Hartford, Connecticut
People from Rockville, Connecticut
American pop pianists
American male pianists
Singer-songwriters from New York (state)
20th-century American pianists
Country musicians from Connecticut
20th-century American male singers
21st-century American male singers
Singer-songwriters from Connecticut
Bronze Records artists